William Bruce Ellis Ranken (1881–1941) was an Edwardian aesthete. Ranken's first exhibition in 1904 at the Carfax Gallery in London was well-received by artists and art critics.

Gallery

References

Paintings by artist